Biete Maryam is one of the monolithic rock-cut Rock-Hewn Churches, Lalibela of the Ethiopian Orthodox Tewahedo Church. It is part of the UNESCO World Heritage Site at Lalibela.

Like the other churches of Lalibela, its precise date of construction is unknown, although it was built no earlier than the 7th century AD (during the Kingdom of Axum) and no later than the 13th century AD (during the Solomonic dynasty and Ethiopian Empire). The churches of Lalibela, including Biete Maryam, are traditionally ascribed to having been built during the reign of the Zagwe dynasty ruler Gebre Mesqel Lalibela (r. ca. 1181–1221). Archaeological analyses have discerned that the ruins of defensive fortifications date to roughly the 8th century AD, while the monolithic rock-cut churches were built in two stages: the first from the 11th to early 12th centuries, and the second phase from the late 12th to early 13th centuries.

3D Documentation 
The Zamani Project spatially documented the rock-hewn churches of Lalibela during four field campaigns between 2005-2009. A 3D model of  Biete Maryam (House of Miriam/House of Mary) was created. The documentation was carried with the support of the Andrew W Mellon Foundation and in cooperation with the World Monuments Funds. Over 1200 terrestrial laser scans where acquired to generate 3D models of 14 monuments. Panorama tours combining photographic full-dome panoramas and covering all churches were also generated. Textured 3D models, panorama tours, elevations, sections and plans are available on www.zamaniproject.org.

References 

Rock-Hewn Churches, Lalibela